Nemoscolus is a genus of orb-weaver spiders first described by Eugène Simon in 1895.

Species
 it contains fifteen species, all found in Africa except for N. laurae, found in the western Mediterranean:
Nemoscolus affinis Lessert, 1933 – Congo
Nemoscolus caudifer Strand, 1906 – West Africa
Nemoscolus cotti Lessert, 1933 – Mozambique
Nemoscolus elongatus Lawrence, 1947 – South Africa
Nemoscolus kolosvaryi Caporiacco, 1947 – Uganda
Nemoscolus lateplagiatis Simon, 1907 – Guinea-Bissau
Nemoscolus laurae (Simon, 1868) – Western Mediterranean
Nemoscolus niger Caporiacco, 1936 – Libya
Nemoscolus obscurus Simon, 1897 – South Africa
Nemoscolus rectifrons Roewer, 1961 – Senegal
Nemoscolus semilugens Denis, 1966 – Libya
Nemoscolus tubicola (Simon, 1887) – South Africa
Nemoscolus turricola Berland, 1933 – Mali
Nemoscolus vigintipunctatus Simon, 1897 – South Africa
Nemoscolus waterloti Berland, 1920 – Madagascar

References

Araneidae
Araneomorphae genera
Spiders of Africa
Taxa named by Eugène Simon